Thomas Greely Stevenson' (February 3, 1836 – May 10, 1864) was a general in the Union Army during the American Civil War.  He was killed in action during the battle of Spotsylvania Courthouse.

Biography
Stevenson was born in Boston, Massachusetts.  He was 25 years old when the Civil War began and had risen from private to major in the Massachusetts Militia at that time.  On December 3, 1861 Stevenson was appointed colonel of the 24th Massachusetts Volunteer Infantry.  He led his regiment in the battles of Roanoke Island and New Bern.  Following the capture of New Bern significant Union reinforcements arrived in North Carolina and Stevenson assumed command of a brigade under John G. Foster.

When much of the Union forces in North Carolina were recalled to Virginia, Foster's command, including Stevenson's brigade, were left behind.  He participated in Foster's Goldsborough Expedition and afterward was promoted to brigadier general on December 24, 1862.  He then held a series of quiet commands along the Atlantic coast in North and South Carolina.  

During the siege of Charleston Harbor Stevenson commanded the 3rd Brigade in Alfred H. Terry's division.  He remained in brigade command around Charleston until January 1864.  On April 19, 1864 he was placed in command of the 1st Division, IX Corps.  Stevenson had previously fought alongside many of the men from IX Corps in North Carolina.  Now, he was one of Burnside's ablest division commanders. He led his new division into action at the battles of the Wilderness and Spotsylvania.  On May 10, 1864 while resting beneath a tree, Stevenson was shot through the head by a sniper's bullet.  His body was returned to Massachusetts where he was buried at Mount Auburn Cemetery in Cambridge.

Fort Stevenson in North Dakota was named in Thomas Stevenson's honor. His brother, Robert Hooper Stevenson, was a colonel and brevet brigadier general in the Union Army. Battery Stevenson, located on Fort Warren, George's Island, Suffolk County, Massachusetts was named after General Stevenson on 14 February, 1902.

References
 Eicher, John H., and Eicher, David J., Civil War High Commands, Stanford University Press, 2001, .
 Rhea, Gordon C., The Battles for Spotsylvania Court House and the Road to Yellow Tavern May 7–12, 1864'', Louisiana State University Press, 1997, .

 U.S.Army, Supplement to the Harbor Defense Project of Boston, Massachusetts, (HDB-AN-45), 31 Jan 1945, CDSG

Union Army generals
People of Massachusetts in the American Civil War
1836 births
1864 deaths
Burials at Mount Auburn Cemetery
Union military personnel killed in the American Civil War